The Sunday People is a British tabloid Sunday newspaper. It was founded as The People on 16 October 1881.

At one point owned by Odhams Press, The People was acquired along with Odhams by the Mirror Group in 1961, along with the Daily Herald. It is now published by Reach plc, and shares a website with the Mirror papers. In July 2011, when it benefited from the closure of the News of the World, it had an average Sunday circulation of 806,544. By December 2016 the circulation had shrunk to 239,364 and by August 2020 to 125,216.

Notable columnists
Garry Bushell had a two-page television opinion column, "Bushell on the Box", but left in early 2007, later moving to the Daily Star Sunday.
Jimmy Greaves, the former England footballer
Fred Trueman, former England cricketer and fast bowler
Fred Harrison, an established economics author of 19 books
Dean Dunham, consumer columnist and leading authority on consumer law.

Editors

1881: Sebastian Evans
1890: Harry Benjamin Vogel
1900: Joseph Hatton
1913: John Sansome
1922: Robert Donald
1924: Hannen Swaffer
1925: Harry Ainsworth
1957: Stuart Campbell
1966: Bob Edwards
1972: Geoffrey Pinnington
1982: Nicholas Lloyd
1984: Richard Stott
1985: Ernie Burrington
1988: John Blake
1989: Wendy Henry
1989: Ernie Burrington (acting)
1990: Richard Stott
1991: Bill Hagerty
1992: Bridget Rowe
1996: Brendon Parsons
1998: Neil Wallis
2003: Mark Thomas
2008: Lloyd Embley
2012: James Scott
2014: Alison Phillips
2016: Gary Jones
2018: Peter Willis
2020: Paul Henderson
2021: Gemma Aldridge

References

1881 establishments in the United Kingdom
Publications established in 1881
Sunday newspapers published in the United Kingdom
Newspapers published by Reach plc
Odhams Press newspapers